Otsego Lake may refer to:

Bodies of water:
 Otsego Lake (Michigan)
 Otsego Lake (New York)

Other:
 Otsego Lake Township, Michigan
 Otsego Lake, Michigan, an unincorporated community
 Otsego Lake State Park, Michigan